Anbaj (also Romanized as Anbāj) is a village in Lavasan-e Kuchak Rural District, Lavasanat District, Shemiranat County, Tehran Province, Iran. At the 2006 census, its population was 411, in 113 families.

References 

Populated places in Shemiranat County